Jankūnas is a Lithuanian surname. Jankūnas, Jankunas or Jankūnaitė may refer to:

 Angelė Rupšienė (born 1952), née Jankūnaitė, Lithuanian retired basketball player
 Julieta Jankunas (born 1999), Argentine field hockey player
 Paulius Jankūnas (born 1984), Lithuanian basketball player
 Vytenis Jankūnas (born 1961), Lithuanian-American visual artist

Lithuanian-language surnames